Kiss is the eleventh album by L'Arc-en-Ciel, released on November 21, 2007. Its first-press edition had a 23-page photobook and sold out in less than a week. The album reached No. 1 on the Oricon album chart. The song Daybreak's Bell was used as the first opening song for the Gundam 00 series.

Track listing

Personnel
 hyde – vocals, keyboards on track 12
 ken – guitar, backing vocals, keyboards on tracks 1–3, 5-9 and 11, tambourine on track 2
 tetsu – bass guitar, backing vocals, keyboards on tracks 4, 8 and 10, handclap on track 10
 yukihiro – drums, metal percussion on track 2
 Akira Nishidaira – keyboards on tracks 1, 4, 10, handclap on track 10
 Hajime Okano – keyboards on track 2, handclap on track 10, tambourine on track 12
 Toshihiko Komura – saxophone on track 2
 Harunam Togashi – keyboards on tracks 3, 11, acoustic piano on track 3, 7, 11
 Chieko Kanehara – strings on tracks 10 and 12
 Jeremy Lubbock – conductor on track 6
 Bruce Dukov, Becky Bunnell, Darius Campo, Pip Clarke, Charles Everett, Armen Garabedian, Pat Johnson, Peter Kent, Miran Kojian, Dennis Molchan, Anatoly Rosinski, Haim Shtrum, Mari Tsumura, Shari Zippert – violin on track 6
 Marilyn Baker, Dennyse Buffum, Pam Goldsmith, Jimbo Ross – viola on track 6
 Larry Corbett, Ernie Ehrhardt, Vanessa Freebairn-Smith, Suzie Katayama, Steve Richards, Dan Smith – cello on track 6
 Masahiro Kobayashi – trumpet on tracks 9 and 12
 Ta Kobayashi, Isao Sakuma, Mikio Saitou – trumpet on tracks 9
 Hikoutsu Fujita, Yuji Uesato – horn on track 9
 Kiyoshi Satou – tuba on track 9
 Takeshi Hatano – keyboards on track 12
 Masahiko Sugasasa – trumpet on track 12
 Youichi Murata, Masanori Hirohara – trombone
 Kazuhiko Kondou – alto saxophone and flute on track 12
 Ooji Miyamoto – tenor saxophone on track 12
 Yoshiaki Satou – accordion on track 12

References 

2007 albums
L'Arc-en-Ciel albums